Tushingham cum Grindley is a former civil parish, now in the parish of Tushingham-cum-Grindley, Macefen and Bradley, in Cheshire West and Chester, England. It contains 15 buildings that are recorded in the National Heritage List for England as designated listed buildings.  Of these, one is listed at Grade I, the highest of the three grades, and the others are at Grade II, the lowest grade.  The parish is entirely rural, and the listed buildings are mainly houses, churches, farms, and associated structures.  The Llangollen Canal runs through the parish, and two structures associated with the canal are also listed.

Key

Buildings

See also
Listed buildings in Wigland
Listed buildings in Chidlow
Listed buildings in Malpas
Listed buildings in Marbury cum Quoisley
Listed buildings in Wirswall
Listed buildings in Whitchurch Urban

References
Citations

Sources

 

Listed buildings in Cheshire West and Chester
Lists of listed buildings in Cheshire